Kostyuninskaya is a rural locality (a village) in Lipetskoye Rural Settlement, Verkhovazhsky District, Vologda Oblast, Russia. The population was 4 as of 2002.

Geography 
The distance to Verkhovazhye is 70.7 km, to Leushinskaya is 3 km. Ivanovskaya, Nikulinskaya, Leushinskaya are the nearest rural localities.

References 

Rural localities in Verkhovazhsky District